The Global Risk Institute in Financial Services (GRI) was founded by the public and private sectors in Canada to respond to their needs for better intelligence, information and training regarding risk in the financial services sector.  Current members of GRI include many of the major banks, insurance companies and pension funds in Canada.

Now expanding internationally, GRI's mandate is to develop applied and integrative research in financial risk and enhance risk education for organizations around the world. Through research and education programs, GRI builds integrated risk management capacity for private and public sector risk professionals. GRI also acts as a hub, stimulating evidence-based debate between regulators, practitioners and academics engaged in risk.

Sonia Baxendale is the current CEO of GRI.  Previously, Sonia was the President, Retail Markets of the Canadian Imperial Bank of Commerce.

GRI funds research projects and hosts workshops and conferences targeted to practitioners and academics involved in risk management.  Some examples of GRI research can be found in GRI whitepapers

References

External links
 

Think tanks based in Canada